Armudlu (also Romanized as Ārmūdlū and Armoodloo; also known as Ārmanlū, Ārmātlū, Armotlū, Armūtlī, and Yān Cheshmeh) is a village in Golestan Rural District, in the Central District of Jajrom County, North Khorasan Province, Iran. At the 2006 census, its population was 211, in 52 families.

References 

Populated places in Jajrom County